Richard Alfred Rossiter (December 19, 1886  January 26, 1977) was an American astronomer, known for the Rossiter–McLaughlin effect. Rossiter served as director of the Lamont–Hussey Observatory from 1928 until 1952.

Early life
Rossiter was born in Oswego, New York, on December 19, 1886. He graduated from Wesleyan University in 1914, and married Jane van Dusen in 1915. He taught mathematics at Wesleyan Seminary for five years before enrolling in the astronomy program at the University of Michigan. He earned a master's degree in 1920, and a doctorate three years later. His doctoral dissertation, a study of the spectrum of Beta Lyrae, demonstrated that the shift that it exhibited could be accounted for by stellar rotation.

Rossiter and his wife had two children, Laura and Alfred.

Career
In 1928 Rossiter became the first director of the Lamont–Hussey Observatory operated in South Africa by the University of Michigan. During this tenure at the observatory, he discovered more than 5,000 double stars. His Catalogue of Southern Double Stars, published in 1955, was dedicated to W.  J. Hussey, one of the professors for whom the observatory was named.

Published works
 New Southern Double Stars (first list) Found at the Lamont-Hussey Observatory of the University of Michigan at Bloemfontein, Royal Astronomical Society, 1933
 The orbit and rotation of the brighter component of Beta Lyrae, University of Michigan Press, Ann Arbor, Michigan, 1933
 Catalogue of Southern Double Stars (Publication of the Observatory of the University of Michigan, Volume XI), University of Michigan Press, Ann Arbor, Michigan, 1955

Later life
Rossiter retired in Natal, South Africa in 1953, never returning to the U.S. He died at the age of 90 in Bloemfontein.

References

1886 births
1977 deaths
American astronomers
People from Oswego, New York
Wesleyan University alumni
University of Michigan alumni
Scientists from New York (state)